Curse of the Komodo is a 2004 American science fiction film directed by Jim Wynorski under the pseudonym Jay Andrews. On a isolated island in the middle of the Pacific Ocean, genetically mutated Komodo dragons find themselves facing the prospect of a feast. Their main course consists of a team of scientists that has been ordered by the military to destroy all evidence of the secret experiments it has been conducting. Their dessert is served in the form of a group of robbers who arrive on the forsaken island. Unless the group manages to destroy the killer lizards, mankind is doomed. It was followed by Komodo vs. Cobra.

Plot
An experiment on an isolated island in the middle of the Pacific Ocean results in the enlargement of a group of komodo dragons. However, the dragons break free, and kill most of the scientists, the only survivor being Rebecca Phipps, whose father Nathan is part of the program on land. Later, a military team is dispatched to kill the dragons, although all are killed except soldiers Hanson and Jason Blake, who hide in Rebecca's private house with an electric gate. Nathan and his colleague and girlfriend Dawn Porter are soon sent to rescue the survivors.

On an island in Hawaii, a group of criminals consisting of Drake, Reece and Drake's girlfriend Tiffany, rob a casino and escape in a helicopter with their pilot Jack. However, they're forced to land on the island due to a storm. The next morning, Dawn collects evidence that proves the komodo's venom has the ability to infect humans, turning them into zombie-like creatures. Jack tells the criminals he needs spare parts to fix damage inside the helicopter's engine. As they begin wandering the island, they find Dawn, Nathan, Rebecca, and Hanson fighting one of the dragons, which has infected Jason. The group manages to evade the dragon and Nathan reluctantly lets the criminals reside in the house. Nathan attempts to negotiate a rescue with military officer Foster on land, although Foster keeps pushing back the rescue mission.

Later that night, Reece, who had come in contact with the komodo's saliva earlier, slowly becomes infected. The komodo returns and the men desperately attempt to fight it off. An infected Reece walks outside and is eaten by the komodo, which heads back into the jungle. The next day, Nathan becomes fed up with Foster's negotiations, and convinces the group to make a break for the helicopter, which Jack reveals was never damaged. During the trip to the helicopter, Tiffany and Hanson were killed and Nathan becomes infected, slowly turning into a zombie. The group soon reaches the helicopter, although encounter the komodo. Nathan sacrifices himself by distracting the komodo long enough to allow Jack, Dawn, Drake, and Rebecca to reach the helicopter.

On land, Foster initiates a bombing of the entire island in order to eliminate witnesses of the experiment's creations. The survivors are about to take off, although Drake goes back for a bag containing the casino money, which he had left behind. The bombing soon occurs, forcing Jack, Dawn and Rebecca to take off, leaving Drake on the island. Upon learning that three survivors have escaped the island, Foster commits suicide. On the island, Drake is revealed to have survived the bombing, also is soon eaten by a group of komodo offspring.

Cast
 Tim Abell as Jack
 Gail Harris as Dawn Porter
 Melissa Brasselle as Tiffany
 Paul Logan as Drake
 Jay Richardson as Foster
 Cam Newlin as Reece
 Glori-Anne Gilbert as Rebecca Phipps
 Ted Monte as Hanson
 William Langlois as Nathan Phipps
 J.P. Davis as Jason Blake
 Arthur Roberts as Detective
 Richard Gabai as Jeffries
 Daryl Haney as Finton
 Scott Fresina as Hotel Guest
 Buck Flower as The Cashier
 Robert Donavan as Hotel Manager
 Rob Sanchez as Security Guard
 Benjamin Sacks as Military Liaison

Production
The film had its origins when Wynorski was shooting the film Treasure Hunt in Hawaii. He says he "took three of the actors to a secluded waterfall  location on their day off and shot what would become the first segment of Curse. Later, when I returned to Los Angeles,  Steve Latshaw wrote the entire script based on segment I had already shot on location. It all turned out rather fun; so much so that they asked me to do a sequel. I said I would do it provided they sent myself and the entire cast to Hawaii to film it...which they did."

References

External links
 
 
 

2004 films
2004 horror films
2000s action horror films
2000s monster movies
American monster movies
American action horror films
Giant monster films
Films about lizards
Films set on islands
Films directed by Jim Wynorski
Syfy original films
2000s English-language films
2000s American films